Pierantonio is a given name of Italian origin. Notable people with this name include:

Pierantonio Clementi (born 1947), Italian biathlete
Pierantonio Costa (1939–2021), Italian businessman and diplomat
Pierantonio Stiattesi, Italian Renaissance artist
Pierantonio Tasca (1858–1934), Italian opera composer
Pierantonio Tremolada (born 1956), Italian catholic bishop

See also
A.S.D. Pierantonio Calcio 1965, an Italian association football club